Talarian was a provider of real-time infrastructure software. Now part of TIBCO, it was a veteran provider of message-oriented middleware.

Talarian was a member of the Business Integration Group (BIG), the Internet Protocol Multicast Initiative (IPMI), the Securities Industry Middleware Council (SIMC), the Object Management Group (OMG), and the Internet Engineering Task Force (IETF).

SmartSockets 

SmartSockets was the main product of Talarian. It is a real-time message-oriented middleware (MOM) which is scalable and fault tolerant. Its programming model is built specifically to offer high-speed interprocess communication (IPC) for multiprocessor architecture, scalability and reliability.

It supports a variety of communication paradigms including publish-subscribe, adaptive multicast, redundant connections, peer-to-peer, and RPC.

Included as part of the SmartSockets package are graphical tools for monitoring and debugging applications.

It is supported on a wide range of platforms: 
 HP-UX
 AIX
 Linux
 Compaq NSK/OSS
 Tru64
 OpenVMS
 Windows
 Solaris
 Irix
 VxWorks

Applications using SmartSockets can be developed with the following languages:
 C API
 C++ Class Libraries
 ActiveX Components
 Java Class Library

SmartSockets is now a product of TIBCO. See acquisition below.

Acquisition by TIBCO 

In January 2002 TIBCO acquired Talarian for approximately $115 million. It was its primary competitor in the delivery of high-performance messaging solutions.

TIBCO paid $5.30 per share, half in stock and half in cash, for each of Talarian's outstanding shares.

Customers 

Talarian customers were large end-users, OEMs and systems integrators in need of solutions where real-time data flow supports high information volumes.

List of Famous Customers:
 Boeing 
 AT&T 
 Hewlett-Packard 
 Cisco
 MTR 
 New York Stock Exchange
 NASA's ground control station for the Hubble Space Telescope

References
Talarian : Everything You Need To Know About Middleware

2002 mergers and acquisitions
Middleware
Software companies based in California
Defunct software companies of the United States
Software companies established in 1989
Software companies disestablished in 2002